Rebecca Ellen Greer (born 1936) is an American nonfiction writer and also served as an editor for Woman's Day magazine.

Biography
Rebecca Greer majored in communications at the University of Florida.  She graduated with a bachelor of science degree from the College of Journalism and Communications in 1957.  In 1998, she was named a distinguished alumna of the College of Journalism and Communications at the University of Florida. The University of Florida maintains a collection of her manuscripts in their Special and Area Studies Library.

Her non-fiction book Why Isn't a Nice Girl Like You Married? (1969) was a bestseller and seminal book on feminism.  She taught nonfiction writing at the New School for Social Research.

Published books
 Why Isn't a Nice Girl Like You Married? (1969)
 How To Live Rich When You're Not (1975)
 No Rocking Chair For Me (2004)

See also
 List of feminists

External links
Named an outstanding alumni
article from The Ledger

References

University of Florida College of Journalism and Communications alumni
Living people
American women writers
Writers from Florida
1936 births
American women journalists
20th-century American journalists
20th-century American women
21st-century American women